A sling or runner is an item of climbing equipment consisting of a tied or sewn loop of webbing.  These can be wrapped around sections of rock, hitched to other pieces of equipment, or tied directly to a tensioned line using a Prusik style knot.  They may be used as  anchors, to extend an anchor to reduce rope drag, in anchor equalization, or to climb a rope.

Types

Slings come both sewn to length and assembled from loose webbing knotted as desired. Webbing for slings, also known as tape, is sold off the reel, cut to length with a hot knife to prevent fraying, and tied as desired with a water knot.

Sewn slings have a rated breaking strength of at least . Short sewn slings are a component of quickdraws, sometimes known as dogbones.

Traditionally, slings have been made of nylon.  Increasingly, ultra high molecular weight polyethylene sold under the brand names Dyneema, Dynex and Spectra is used. These have much lower melting points than nylon, making them a potentially poor choice where high rope friction may occur. However this specialty polyethylene is lighter, smaller, and absorbs less water than nylon, and therefore has become popular.

Gear sling
A gear sling is a loop of webbing used to organize or carry equipment.  These can be custom items meant only to carry light gear, fully load-bearing manufactured gear racks capable of doubling for a sling, or simply a regular sling used to rack gear.

See also
 Daisy Chain

References

External links
Ledtex Webbing

Climbing equipment
Mountaineering equipment